Fantu Magiso Manedo (born June 9, 1992) is an Ethiopian runner who specializes in the 400 metres and 800 metres.

Achievements

References

External links

1992 births
Living people
Ethiopian female middle-distance runners
Ethiopian female sprinters
African Games silver medalists for Ethiopia
African Games medalists in athletics (track and field)
Athletes (track and field) at the 2011 All-Africa Games
21st-century Ethiopian women